Wohu or Wo Hu or variation, may refer to:

Places
 Wohu (卧虎镇), a town in Shuangliao, Jilin, China; see List of township-level divisions of Jilin
 Wo Hu Shan (卧虎山, Crouching Tiger Mountain), a bunker complex during the Taiyuan campaign
 Wo Hu Tun (卧虎屯, Crouching Tiger Village), a stronghold during the Battle of Siping

People
 Wohu (斡忽), Prince of Ye (鄴王); son of Emperor Taizu of Jin

Arts and entertainment
 Wo Hu (臥虎, Crouching Tiger), a 2006 Hong Kong crime drama film
 Crouching Tiger, Hidden Dragon (臥虎藏龍, "Wòhu Cánglóng"), a 2000 U.S. Mandarin-language wuxia Hollywood film

Other uses
 をふ (wohu), a historical kana orthography

See also

 Hudun (disambiguation) including 虎蹲 (crouching tiger)
 Crouching Tiger (disambiguation)
 Crouching Tiger, Hidden Dragon (disambiguation)
 
 
 WO (disambiguation)
 Hu (disambiguation)